Matteucci is an Italian surname. Notable people with the surname include:

Alice Matteucci (born 1995), Italian tennis player
Amos Matteucci (1915–2008), Italian javelin thrower
Andrea Matteucci (born 1962), Italian criminal and serial killer
Carlo Matteucci (1811–1868), Italian physicist and neurophysiologist
Domenico Matteucci (1895–1976), Italian sport shooter
Ella Matteucci, Canadian ice hockey and baseball player
Enzo Matteucci (1933–1992), Italian footballer and manager
Felice Matteucci (1808–1887), Italian engineer and inventor
Mike Matteucci (born 1971), Canadian ice hockey player
Pellegrino Matteucci (1850–1881), Italian explorer
Sherry Scheel Matteucci (born 1947), American attorney

See also
Matteucci effect, a magnetomechanical effect

Italian-language surnames
Patronymic surnames
Surnames from given names